Edge of Appalachia Preserve is a series of ten adjacent nature preserves located along the Appalachian Escarpment in Adams County, Ohio.  Four of the ten preserves, Lynx Prairie, Buzzardroost Rock, Red Rock and The Wilderness, are National Natural Landmarks.  The Preserve is owned and operated by The Nature Conservancy and Cincinnati Museum Center. It is the largest privately owned nature preserve in Ohio.

The area encompassing the Edge of Appalachia Preserve was first studied by ecologist Emma Lucy Braun in the 1920s.  However, it was not until 1959 when the Nature Conservancy purchased 42 acres (170,000 m²) near Lynx, Ohio that the Edge of Appalachia Preserve was created and established as a protected preserve.

The Edge of Appalachia Preserve is among the most biologically assorted areas in the Midwestern United States. The preserve is predominantly wooded with over 13,000 acres (53 km²) of forestland. Over 100 rare species of animals and plants are found within the preserve.  The Edge of Appalachia Preserve contains 30 ecological communities, eight of which are classified as rare throughout the world. Among its rare plants are the Canby’s mountain lover and the northern white cedar. The Edge of Appalachia Preserve is also home to the rare green salamander and Allegheny woodrat.

References

External links
Edge of Appalachia Preserve at Nature Conservancy
Richard & Lucile Durrell Edge of Appalachia Preserve at Cincinnati Museum Center
Hiking information at Hiking Ohio Parks
Edge of Appalachia Preserve at American Byways

Nature reserves in Ohio
Protected areas of Adams County, Ohio
Nature Conservancy preserves